Endotricha hoenei is a species of snout moth in the genus Endotricha. It is found in China (Guangdong, Fujian and Guangxi).

The wingspan is 19−21 mm.

References

Moths described in 1963
Endotrichini